Qujing NO.1 Middle School is a senior middle school in Yunnan, China. Set up in 1913 by E. Cai, the Governor of Yunnan, the school is located at the center of Qujing City. There are many famous cultural relics in this school, such as Cuan monument, which is one of the greatest achievements of the art of Chinese calligraphy.

References

Educational institutions established in 1913
Schools in China
High schools in Yunnan
1913 establishments in China
Qujing